Sir James Anderson Murdoch  (10 March 1867 – 30 January 1939) was a Scottish-born Australian politician.

He was born in Edinburgh to cabinetmaker Thomas Murdoch and Margaret Anderson. He worked at a wool warehouse before migrating to Melbourne in 1884; after a period in Brisbane, he established a business in Sydney in 1893. In 1892 he married Isabella Binning, with whom he had three daughters. His business eventually became a large retail company. During World War I he served with the Australian Army Medical Corps, holding the rank of lieutenant-colonel; he was mentioned in despatches four times. In 1918 he was appointed a Companion of the Order of St Michael and St George. 
Appointed to the New South Wales Legislative Council as a Nationalist in 1923, he was created a Knight Commander of the Order of the British Empire in 1928. He left the Legislative Council on its reconstitution in 1934, and died at Manly in 1939.

Burnside Public School 
In 1922, Burnside Public School (known as Murdoch School for many years) was built for 17,000 pounds by James Murdoch in order to overcome the "problems of transporting the Burnside Homes children to North Parramatta School".

References

1867 births
1939 deaths
Nationalist Party of Australia members of the Parliament of New South Wales
United Australia Party members of the Parliament of New South Wales
Members of the New South Wales Legislative Council
Australian Companions of the Order of St Michael and St George
Australian Knights Commander of the Order of the British Empire
Australian politicians awarded knighthoods